Kyle Egan (born 5 December 1998) is an English footballer who plays for Truro City.

Career
Egan began his career with Exeter City and made his professional debut on 13 August 2016 in a 2–1 defeat against Hartlepool United.

Egan had previously joined Bideford on loan in March 2016, and in March 2017, he joined Dorchester Town on loan for the rest of the season.

Egan rejoined Dorchester on a six-month loan deal in July 2017, and signed for them permanently following his release from Exeter in December 2017. In May 2018, Egan extended his stay at Dorchester by signing a new one-year contract.

Egan joined Tiverton Town in 2020.

Egan joined Truro City in the summer of 2022

References

External links

Kyle Egan at Aylesbury United

1998 births
Living people
English footballers
English Football League players
Exeter City F.C. players
Tiverton Town F.C. players
Association football defenders
Bideford A.F.C. players
Dorchester Town F.C. players
Truro City F.C. players